Don Tonino is an Italian crime-comedy television series.

Cast

Andrea Roncato as Don Tonino
Gigi Sammarchi as Commissioner Sangiorgi
Manuel De Peppe as Gabriele
 Nicola De Buono as  Don Oreste
 Lara Motta as  Maddalena 
Vanessa Gravina as  Sara
 Paolo Lizza as  Angelo
 Marco Milano as  Marco

See also
 List of Italian television series

References

External links
 

Italian television series
1988 Italian television series debuts
1990 Italian television series endings
Italia 1 original programming